Scopula impropriaria is a moth of the  family Geometridae. It is found in Venezuela and Brazil.

References

Moths described in 1861
impropriaria
Moths of South America